The Flagstaff Railroad Addition Historic District is significant because of its association with the Atchison, Topeka and Santa Fe Railway as well as U.S. Route 66. The original boundary was roughly bounded by Santa Fe RR tracks, Agassiz and Beaver Sts., Birch and Aspen Avenues. The district was expanded twice to add nine buildings along Phoenix Avenue from Beaver Street to San Francisco Avenue,  and a building at 122 East Route 66.

Disastrous fires swept through early Flagstaff; in 1897, the city passed an ordinance requiring all buildings in the business area to be built of brick, stone or iron.

Several of the buildings in the District are associated with well-known businessmen of the late 1800s and early 1900s.  These include John W. Weatherford, who constructed the Weatherford Hotel, the Babbitt brothers David, George, William and Charles,  whose names are associated with several buildings in the District, and Thomas E. Pollock, Sr.

References

Romanesque Revival architecture in Arizona
Buildings and structures completed in 1883
National Register of Historic Places in Flagstaff, Arizona
Historic districts on the National Register of Historic Places in Arizona
Tourist attractions in Flagstaff, Arizona